Majestic Building may refer to:

United States
 Majestic Building (Indianapolis, Indiana)
 Majestic Building (Detroit)
 Majestic Manufacturing Company Buildings, St. Louis, Missouri, listed on the NRHP in St. Louis, Missouri
 The Majestic (New York City), a housing cooperative at 115 Central Park West in New York City

Elsewhere
 Majestic Building (Bucaramanga, Colombia), one of the taller buildings in South America
 Majestic Centre, Wellington, New Zealand
 The Majestic, Singapore, a building in Singapore
 Majestic, Leeds, UK, a Grade II listed building

See also
Majestic Hotel (disambiguation)
Majestic Theatre (disambiguation)